Meyer Robert Guggenheim (May 17, 1885 – November 16, 1959) was an American diplomat and a member of the prominent Guggenheim family.

Born in New York City, he was the son of Daniel Guggenheim (1856–1930), brother of Harry Frank Guggenheim, and nephew of Simon Guggenheim. In January 1938 he married his 4th wife Rebecca Pollard in Miami Beach on his yacht Firenze. Pollard had finalized her divorce to William van Lennep a week earlier. After Guggenheim's death she married John Logan.

He attended Columbia College with the class of 1907, but left before graduation. In 1909 he donated the trophy and prize money for the Ocean to Ocean Automobile Endurance Contest that coincided with the  Alaska–Yukon–Pacific Exposition. As the contest was underway; he was arrested for speeding in New York City - a possible publicity stunt.

He served with the United States Army during World War I. He was appointed United States Ambassador to Portugal, serving between 1953 and 1954.

Guggenheim died in Washington, D.C., in 1959, aged 74, and was interred in Arlington National Cemetery in Arlington, Virginia.

References

1885 births
1959 deaths
United States Army personnel of World War I
Jewish American military personnel
Meyer Robert Guggenheim
Businesspeople from New York City
People from Washington, D.C.
Burials at Arlington National Cemetery
Ambassadors of the United States to Portugal
Columbia College (New York) alumni